Baron  was an admiral in the Imperial Japanese Navy during World War II.

Biography
Tomioka was born in Hiroshima, but was raised in Nagano prefecture. His father, Admiral Tomioka Sadayasu had been ennobled by Emperor Meiji for services in the Russo-Japanese War. He was a graduate of the 45th class of the Imperial Japanese Naval Academy in 1917, ranking 21st out of 98 cadets.

As a sub-lieutenant, he served on the battleship , and destroyer .

On 14 May 1927, he was given his first command: the destroyer . After graduation from Naval Staff College in 1927 and promotion to lieutenant commander, he was assigned as naval attaché to France, where he remainder until June 1932. During this period, he was also part of the Japanese delegation to the World Disarmament Conference in Geneva Switzerland. From May 1933 onwards, he held various staff posts. He was promoted to commander on 15 November 1934 and captain on 15 November 1938.

Assigned to Imperial Japanese Navy General Staff as an Operations Section chief in October 1940, Tomioka continued to serve in that capacity during the first two years of the Pacific War, during which time he unsuccessfully opposed the attack on Pearl Harbor. He also strongly opposed Admiral Isoroku Yamamoto's plans for the Midway operation, proposing that Japan occupy the much more strategically important Fiji and Samoa island groups instead. Tomioka also pushed for a focus on the occupation of Port Moresby in New Guinea, either as a staging ground for an invasion of Australia, or to draw out the American carrier fleet as far as possible from its home bases. He was overruled when Yamamoto threatened to resign.

From September 1943, Tomioka served as chief of staff to the Southeast Area Fleet and was promoted to rear admiral on 1 November 1943.

Tomioka returned to Naval General Staff as the department's Operations Bureau chief in December 1944, and held that position for the remainder of the war.

In his later years, Tomioka assisted in editing a Japanese history of the Pacific War and, in 1951, he served on a 12-man commission to assist the Japanese government in the establishment of the present day Japan Self-Defense Forces. He later was lecturer at the Japanese Defense Research Institute, until his death in 1970.

References

Books

External links

Notes 

1897 births
1970 deaths
People from Hiroshima Prefecture
Kazoku
Imperial Japanese Navy admirals
Japanese admirals of World War II